The LSU Tigers women's beach volleyball team represents Louisiana State University in the sport of beach volleyball. The Tigers compete in Division I of the National Collegiate Athletics Association (NCAA) and the Coastal Collegiate Sports Association (CCSA), and play their home matches at the new on-campus LSU Beach Volleyball Stadium in Baton Rouge, Louisiana. They are currently led by head coach Russell Brock.

History 
The LSU Tigers beach volleyball team, originally known as the "LSU Tigers sand volleyball team", played its first season in 2014. The first coach of the Tigers was Fran Flory (2014–2016) who compiled a record of 40–28 at LSU.

In 2016, Russell Brock became head beach volleyball coach at LSU.

Year-by-year results 
<small>

Sources:

Home Court/Practice and Training facilities

LSU Beach Volleyball Stadium
The LSU Beach Volleyball Stadium is the home court and practice facility for the beach volleyball team starting with the 2019 season.

Mango's Beach Volleyball Club

Mango's Beach Volleyball Club was the home court and practice facility for the beach volleyball team from 2014 to 2018. Mango's is a privately owned beach volleyball facility open to the public, located in Baton Rouge, Louisiana. The facility has 13 sand courts.

Head coaches

See also
 LSU Tigers and Lady Tigers
 List of NCAA women's beach volleyball programs

References

External links
 

 
Beach volleyball clubs established in 2014
2014 establishments in Louisiana